Ambrose Fernando (1912 – 11 January 1999) was an Indian businessman and politician.

Early life
Fernando was born in Kanyakumari in a Paravar family. He went to Colombo at a young age to work. He returned to Kanyakumari in 1937 and married Mochammal Fernando. He joined the Indian National Congress and entered politics.

Politics
He became a member of the then Travancore Cochin Legislative Assembly representing Kanyakumari from 20 March 1948 to 18 February 1952. He took an active part in the agitation to separate Kanyakumari district from Kerala and to join it to Madras State, now Tamil Nadu state.

Government posts
Chairman, Quality control appellate Panel, Fish and Fisheries Products
Vice Chairman, Marine Products Export Development Authority
Member of:
Bureau of I.S.I Fish and Fisheries Products Sectional Committee
Consultative Committee Fishery Survey of India
Regional Management Committee of C.M.F.R.I Tuticorin

He wrote many articles on his recommendations for the welfare of the fishing community. One such article titled "Problems Facing the Fishermen of the Beche-De-Mer Industry" was published by Central Marine Fisheries Research Institute.

Business
Fernando later started a dry fish export business in Tuticorin and developed an interest in fisheries. He was invited by the central and state governments to join various fish industry meetings, based on his suggestions to develop fisheries as well as the trade. He was a member of various government delegations which visited other countries in order to study the trade.

Business posts

President of:
Fish Exporters Chamber, Tuticorin
Tuticorin Catamaran Fishermen's Association
KanyaKumari Township Fisherman Development Organization
Tuticorin Citizen Council

Recognition
Fernando was honored by the government and industry jointly, being awarded the title Pioneer in Fisheries.

1912 births
1999 deaths
Indian National Congress politicians from Tamil Nadu
People from Kanyakumari district
Travancore–Cochin MLAs 1949–1952